Hamud-e Asi (also Romanized as Ḩamūd-e ‘Āşī and Ḩamūd ‘Āşī; also known as Abr Fūsh) is a village in Bostan Rural District, Bostan District, Dasht-e Azadegan County, Khuzestan Province, Iran. At the 2006 census, its population was 129, in 18 families.

References 

Populated places in Dasht-e Azadegan County